The World Heavyweight Championship was a professional wrestling world heavyweight championship in WWE. It was established by WWE in 2002 after WWE bought out World Championship Wrestling (WCW) and Extreme Championship Wrestling (ECW), and split its roster into two brands, Raw and SmackDown!, in a brand extension.
WWE's original world title, the WWE Championship, with which the WCW World Heavyweight Championship had been unified in 2001, was designated to the SmackDown! brand; as a result the World Heavyweight Championship was established for the Raw brand. The World Heavyweight Championship is not a continuation of the WCW World Heavyweight Championship, but rather its indirect successor. For a list of champions who have held those titles, see the list of WCW World Heavyweight Champions and list of NWA World Heavyweight Champions respectively.

At the TLC pay-per-view on December 15, 2013, when WWE Champion Randy Orton defeated World Heavyweight Champion John Cena, the World Heavyweight Championship was unified with the WWE Championship, resulting in the retiring of the former, and the renaming of the latter to the WWE World Heavyweight Championship.

The championship was contested in professional wrestling matches, in which participants execute scripted finishes. The first champion was Triple H, who was awarded the title on September 2, 2002, by Eric Bischoff, then-General Manager of Raw, and he also holds the record for longest combined reign at 616 days. Overall, there have been 25 different official champions, with Edge having the most reigns at seven. The longest single reign was held by Batista, lasting 282 days. The final holder was Randy Orton, who was also the youngest champion at the age of 24 when he first won the championship. The Undertaker was the oldest champion when he won the title for the third time at the age of 50 years.

Reigns

Names 

Known as World Championship when Rey Mysterio was champion.

Combined reigns

See also 
 List of former championships in WWE
 World championships in WWE

References 
General
 
Specific

External links 
 Official WWE World Heavyweight Championship history
 World Heavyweight Championship history at Wrestling-Titles.com

WWE championships lists
WWE champions